Efi Thodi (18 January 1964) is a Greek pop singer who specializes in traditional Greek and pop music. She was born and raised in Vrangiana, Karditsa. Her music career began in 1984. Her first songs were in Greek and had a traditional style that she used until 2006.

In March 2009, Thodi made television appearances claiming that she discovered a special spiritual power inside her that enables her to help and heal people. She also claimed that she had seen divine visions. This led Thodi to a mental illness clinic of Sismanogleion hospital, to the dismay of her family.

Discography

Studio albums

Live albums

CD singles

Collaborations

References

1954 births
Living people
Greek laïko singers
20th-century Greek women singers
Greek pop singers
People from Karditsa (regional unit)
21st-century Greek women singers